On the Banks of the River Weser is a 1927 German silent drama film directed by Siegfried Philippi and starring Carl Auen, Olga Engl, and Camilla Spira.

The film's sets were designed by Willi Herrmann.

Cast
In alphabetical order

References

Bibliography

External links

1927 films
1927 drama films
Films of the Weimar Republic
German silent feature films
German drama films
Films directed by Siegfried Philippi
German black-and-white films
Silent drama films
1920s German films
1920s German-language films